Ashburton Forks, formerly known as Spread Eagle, is a small town which lies between the forks of the Ashburton River / Hakatere in the Canterbury Province of New Zealand's South Island. It is approximately 50 km west of Ashburton and about 17 km from the foot of the Southern Alps.

Early settlers
William Campbell, blacksmith by trade, of Oakfield Demesne, County Donegal established the Spreadeagle Farm at Ashburton in the early 1880s with his wife Mary (née Falloon).

Demographics 

Ashburton Forks had a population of 2,214 at the 2018 New Zealand census, an increase of 207 people (10.3%) since the 2013 census, and an increase of 528 people (31.3%) since the 2006 census. There were 840 households. There were 1,197 males and 1,017 females, giving a sex ratio of 1.18 males per female. The median age was 33 years (compared with 37.4 years nationally), with 501 people (22.6%) aged under 15 years, 468 (21.1%) aged 15 to 29, 1,065 (48.1%) aged 30 to 64, and 183 (8.3%) aged 65 or older.

Ethnicities were 82.9% European/Pākehā, 5.6% Māori, 1.1% Pacific peoples, 10.4% Asian, and 5.7% other ethnicities (totals add to more than 100% since people could identify with multiple ethnicities).

The proportion of people born overseas was 22.5%, compared with 27.1% nationally.

Although some people objected to giving their religion, 48.6% had no religion, 42.1% were Christian, 1.1% were Hindu, 0.4% were Muslim, 0.3% were Buddhist and 2.3% had other religions.

Of those at least 15 years old, 303 (17.7%) people had a bachelor or higher degree, and 243 (14.2%) people had no formal qualifications. The median income was $41,800, compared with $31,800 nationally. The employment status of those at least 15 was that 1,104 (64.4%) people were employed full-time, 309 (18.0%) were part-time, and 21 (1.2%) were unemployed.

See also
Ashburton, nearby major town
Methven, nearby major town

References

Populated places in Canterbury, New Zealand